Tiébilé Dramé (born June 9, 1955) is a Malian politician who served in the government of Mali as Minister of Foreign Affairs from 1991 to 1992. In the years since, he has remained active on the political scene, while also acting as a diplomat and mediator in regional crises. Since May 6, 2019 again served as the Minister of Foreign Affairs until the 2020 Malian coup d'état.

Life and career
Dramé was born in Nioro du Sahel. He studied at the Ecole Normale Supérieure of Bamako before obtaining his Advanced studies diploma (French: Diplôme d'études avancées, DEA, an advanced pre-doctoral degree) in African history from the University of Paris (I). His political activity began during his studies.

From 1977 to 1980, he was one of leaders of the Malian National Students' Union (Union Nationale des Elèves et Etudiants du Mali, UNEEM), which opposed Moussa Traoré's regime in Mali. Dramé was imprisoned on several occasions for his opposition to the regime. He then went into exile in Europe, where he worked for Amnesty International from 1988 to 1991. He conducted surveys on the human rights situation in West Africa. A militant for the Malian National Congress for Democratic Initiative (Congrès national d’initiative démocratique, CNID), Dramé returned to Mali when Amadou Toumani Touré toppled Traoré's regime in 1991. He was Minister of Foreign Affairs in the transitional government from 1991 to 1992.

In 1995, he was a consultant for the United Nations to prepare a human rights survey operation in Burundi. That same year, in disagreement with Mountaga Tall, founder of the CNID, he left the party with other militants to found the Party for National Renaissance (Parti pour la renaissance nationale, PARENA), of which he was elected Secretary-General. In 1996, he was appointed as Minister of Arid and Semi-Arid Zones in Ibrahim Boubacar Keïta's government.

He was elected to the National Assembly as a Deputy from Nioro du Sahel in 1997. In November 1999, he became President of PARENA. In 2001, he was elected as President of the West African Economic and Monetary Union (UEMOA).

He ran in the April 2002 presidential election and obtained 3.99% of the votes, taking fourth place. On February 18, 2007, he was nominated as the candidate of PARENA for the April 2007 presidential election. According to official results, Touré won the election by a landslide, while Dramé took third place and 3.04% of the vote. As part of the Front for Democracy and the Republic, a coalition that also included three other presidential candidates, Dramé disputed the results and sought for the election to be annulled, alleging fraud.

The list on which Dramé was running in Nioro du Sahel in the July 2007 parliamentary election (together with ADEMA and the Union for the Republic and Democracy) was rejected by the Constitutional Court, which said that he had multiple birth certificates.

Dramé acted as a United Nations envoy dealing with the early 2009 political crisis in Madagascar.
   
Also a journalist, Dramé founded the weekly newspaper Le républicain ("The Republican") in 1992.

Since May 6, 2019, Tiébilé Dramé serves as Minister of Foreign Affairs in the government of Mali, within the frame of the political agreement signed by the majority and the opposition.

References

Notes 
 This article is based on a translation of the corresponding article from the French Wikipedia, accessed on 28 April 2005

1955 births
Living people
Members of the National Assembly (Mali)
Malian prisoners and detainees
Prisoners and detainees of Mali
People from Kayes Region
Foreign Ministers of Mali
21st-century Malian people